The second season of The Voice of Vietnam began on May 19, 2013 and ended on December 15, 2013 on VTV3. The casting process and preliminary audition took place right after the finale of the previous season. Đàm Vĩnh Hưng and Phan Anh returned as coach and host respectively. Mỹ Linh, Hồng Nhung and Quốc Trung replaced Thu Minh, Trần Lập, Hồ Ngọc Hà as coaches.

This season was won by Vũ Thảo My from team Đàm Vĩnh Hưng.

Teams
Color Key

The Blind Auditions

Episode 1: Blind Auditions, Week 1
The first episode of the show aired on May 19, 2013.

Episode 2: Blind Auditions, Week 2
The second Blind Audition taped episode was broadcast on May 26, 2013.

Episode 3: Blind Auditions, Week 3
The third Blind Audition taped episode was broadcast on June 9, 2013

Episode 4: Blind Auditions, Week 4
The fourth Blind Audition taped episode was broadcast on June 16, 2013

Episode 5: Blind Auditions, Week 5
The final Blind Audition taped episode was broadcast on June 23, 2013

Battle Rounds
The Battle aired from June 30 to August 11, 2013. The "steal" was first introduced this season. Each coach had two steals throughout the Battles. Contestants who won their battles or stolen by another coach advanced to the Knockouts.

The advisers for each team In the Battles were: musician Hồng Kiên for team Mỹ Linh, singer Nguyễn Ngọc Anh for team Đàm Vĩnh Hưng, The Voice Kids coach Thanh Bùi for team Hồng Nhung and music producer Lưu Thiên Hương for team Quốc Trung.

Color key:

The Knockouts 
The Knockout was introduced this season. In this round, two artists from a team were selected into a battle, in which each of them performed a solo song and one would be declared the winner and advanced to the Live shows. The Knockout Rounds aired from August 18 to September 8, 2013.

Color key:

Live shows
This season nine live shows were produced.

Color key

Episodes 14–16: Round 1 (Top 20)
The top 20 performed on the first two live shows, with the result announced on the third night. Within each team, the two top vote-getter was automatically sent through to the next round, each coach then saved one from elimination and the two remaining contestants faced each other in the sing-off.

 Group performance: The Voice of Vietnam 2 coaches (Medley of "Hò Kéo Pháo" & "Chiến Thắng Điện Biên"), Leanne Mitchell and the top 20 ("Yoü and I")
 Musical guests: Vũ Thanh Hằng ("Một"), Đinh Hương ("So I"), Leanne Mitchell & Hương Tràm ("Run to You"), Leanne Mitchell ("It's a Man's Man's Man's World").

Episodes 17–18: Round 2 (Top 16)
All 16 remaining artists performed on liveshow 4 and the results were announced at liveshow 5.
 Musical guests: Đỗ Xuân Sơn & Nguyễn Trọng Khương ("Un-Break My Heart")

Episodes 19: Quarterfinals (Top 12)
The Top 12 performed on liveshow 6, with the result announced at the end of the show.
 Group performance: Top 12 (Medley of "Mong ước kỉ niệm xưa"/"Ngày đầu tiên đi học"/"Bụi phấn"/"Bông hồng tặng cô")
 Musical guests: Bee.T ("Trên Đỉnh Phù Vân")

Episodes 20–21: Semifinal (Top 8)
The two-part semi-finals aired on November 24 and December 8, 2012. Each contestant performed two solo songs, one on each show, and a group performance with their teammate and their coach. The result was announced at the end of night 2.

 Group performance: Jermaine Paul with Phạm Hà Linh, Vũ Cát Tường, Vũ Thảo My, Nguyễn Song Tú & Trần Vũ Hà My ("Roar"), team Hồng Nhung with Hồng Nhung ("Nhớ Mùa Thu Hà Nội"/"Em Còn Nhớ Hay Em Đã Quên"), team Mỹ Linh with Mỹ Linh ("Trưa Vắng"), team Quốc Trung with Quốc Trung ("Say Something"), team Đàm Vĩnh Hưng with Đàm Vĩnh Hưng ("Hãy Đàn Lên")
 Musical guest: Jermaine Paul ("Everybody"/"Open Arms"), Jermaine Paul & Bùi Anh Tuấn ("Without You")

Episodes 22: Finals (Top 4)
The Live Finale aired on December 15, 2013.
 Group performance: Terry McDermott with The Voice of Vietnam 1 top 4 – Hương Tràm, Đinh Hương, Xuân Nghi, Kiên Giang (Medley of "Silent Night"/"O Holy Night"/"Santa Claus Is Comin' to Town")
 Musical guest: Terry McDermott ("I Want to Know What Love Is"/"Let It Be")

Teams' Results

Artist's info

Result details

References

2
2013 Vietnamese television seasons